Till Helmke (born May 6, 1984 in Friedberg, Hesse) is a male track and field sprint athlete who competes internationally for Germany.

Biography
Helmke represented Germany at the 2008 Summer Olympics in Beijing. He competed at the 4x100 metres relay with Tobias Unger, Alexander Kosenkow and Martin Keller. In their qualification heat they placed third behind Jamaica and Canada, but in front of China. Their time of 38.93 was the sixth fastest out of sixteen participating nations in the first round and they qualified for the final. There they sprinted to a time of 38.58 seconds, which was the fifth time.

Achievements

See also
 German all-time top lists - 200 metres

References

External links
 

1984 births
Living people
German male sprinters
Olympic athletes of Germany
Athletes (track and field) at the 2004 Summer Olympics
Athletes (track and field) at the 2008 Summer Olympics
People from Friedberg, Hesse
Sportspeople from Darmstadt (region)